The Rock Garden of Chandigarh is a sculpture garden for rock enthusiasts in Chandigarh, India. It is also known as Nek Chand Saini's Rock Garden of Nathupur  after its founder Nek Chand Saini, a government official who started building the garden secretly in his spare time in 1957.

Description 
The Rock Garden sits near Sukhna Lake. It consists of man-made interlinked waterfalls and many other sculptures that have been made of scrap and other kinds of waste (bottles, glasses, bangles, tiles, ceramic pots, sinks, electrical waste, broken pipes, etc.) which are placed in walled paths.In his spare time, Nek Chand started collecting materials from demolition sites around the city. He recycled these materials into his own vision of the divine kingdom of Sukrani, choosing a gorge in a forest near Sukhna Lake for his work. The gorge had been designated as a land conservancy, a forest buffer established in 1902 that nothing could be built on. Chand's work was illegal, but he was able to hide it for 18 years before it was discovered by the authorities in 1976. By this time, it had grown into a  complex of interlinked courtyards, each filled with hundreds of pottery-covered concrete sculptures of dancers, musicians, and animals.

His work was in danger of being demolished, but he was able to get public opinion on his side. In 1976 the park was inaugurated as a public space. Nek Chand was given a salary, a title ("Sub-Divisional Engineer, Rock Garden") and 50 laborers so that he could work full-time. The Rock Garden appeared on an Indian stamp in 1983. The Rock Garden is still made out of recycled materials. With the government's help, Chand was able to set up collection centers around the city for waste, especially rags and broken ceramics.

When Chand left the country on a lecture tour in 1996, the city withdrew its funding, and vandals attacked the park. The Rock Garden Society took over the administration and upkeep of this unique visionary environment.

The garden is visited by over 5,000 people daily, with more than 12 million visitors since its inception.

Dolls Museum 
There is also a Dolls Museum inside Rock Garden. It was inaugurated by UT Administrator V.P. Singh Badnore to mark the second death anniversary of its founder Nek Chand. The museum comprises 200 rag dolls made from waste cloth. The dolls were made by Nek Chand in the 1970s.

Gallery

See also

 List of single-artist museums

Further reading
 Nek Chand's outsider art: the rock garden of Chandigarh, by Lucienne Peiry, John Maizels, Philippe Lespinasse, Nek Chand. Published by Flammarion, 2006. .
 The Collection, the Ruin and the Theatre: Architecture, sculpture and landscape in Nek Chand's Rock Garden, by Soumyen Bandyopadhyay and Iain Jackson. Liverpool University Press, 2007. .
 Sublime Spaces and Visionary Worlds: Built Environments of Vernacular Artists, by Leslie Umberger (author), Erika Doss (contributor), Ruth Kohler (contributor), Lisa Stone (contributor).

References

External links

 Nekchand Foundation website
 Rock Garden

Visionary environments
Gardens in India
Parks in Chandigarh
Sculpture gardens, trails and parks in India
Chandigarh
Tourist attractions in Chandigarh
1957 establishments in East Punjab